National League 2 North is one of three level four leagues in the English rugby union system and provides semi-professional competition for teams in the northern half of England, the North. The remainder of England is covered by the two counterpart leagues National League 2 East and National League 2 West. The champion club is promoted to National One. Relegation is to either the Regional 1 Midlands or North Premier leagues, depending on where the teams are based. Hull are the current champions.

Before September 2009, it was known as National Division Three North. From 2009 to 2010 the Rugby Football Union (RFU) expanded the league from fourteen to sixteen teams. Each team played thirty league games on a home and away basis. The 2019–20 season ended before all the matches were completed because of the coronavirus pandemic and the RFU used a best playing record formula to decide the final table. Due to the ongoing pandemic, the 2020–21 season was cancelled.

The RFU approved a new structure for the National Leagues from the 2022–23 season. The league is reduced to fourteen teams, there will be a two-week break over Christmas and protected weekend breaks through the season. The competition structure will be reviewed every three years.

Current season

Structure
The league consists of fourteen teams and each play the others on a home and away basis, to make a total of 26 matches each. The champions are promoted to National League 1. The RFU will release details of relegation in the summer.

The results of the matches contribute points to the league as follows:
 4 points are awarded for a win
 2 points are awarded for a draw
 0 points are awarded for a loss, however
 1 losing (bonus) point is awarded to a team that loses a match by 7 points or fewer
 1 additional (bonus) point is awarded to a team scoring 4 tries or more in a match.

Participating teams and locations

League table

National Two North honours

Promotion play-offs
Until the 2018–19 season, there was a play-off between the league runners-up of National League 2 North and National League 2 South, for the third and final promotion place to National League 1. The team with the superior league record having home advantage in the tie. Southern teams have been more successful with fourteen wins to the northern teams four, while the home side has won thirteen teams to the away sides five.

Number of league titles

Hull Ionians (3)
Macclesfield (3)
Caldy (2)
Nuneaton (2)
Aspatria (1)
Birmingham & Solihull (1)
Blaydon (1)
Bradford & Bingley (1)
Broughton Park (1)
Doncaster (1)
Fylde (1)
Halifax (1)
Harrogate (1)
Hull (1)
Kendal (1)
Loughborough Students (1)
Otley (1)
Preston Grasshoppers (1)
Rotherham (1)
Roundhay (1)
Rugby (1)
Sale FC (1)
Stourbridge (1)
Tynedale (1)
Waterloo (1)
Worcester (1)

Original teams
When club rugby began in 1987 this division was called Area 4 North and contained the following teams:

Birkenhead Park (now playing in North 1 West)
Broughton Park (now playing in North 1 West)
Derby (now playing in Midlands 1 East)
Durham City (now playing in North 1 East) 
Lichfield (now playing in Midlands 1 West)
Northern (now playing in Durham/Northumberland 1)
Preston Grasshoppers (now playing in North Premier)
Roundhay (now Leeds Tykes and playing in National League 1)
Rugby Lions (now playing in Midlands 1 East)
Solihull (now Birmingham & Solihull and playing in Midlands 4 West (South))
Stourbridge (still playing in National League 2 North)

League format since 1987

Records
Note that all records are from 1996–97 season onwards as this is widely held as the dawn of professionalism across the English club game. It also offers a better comparison between seasons as the division team numbers are roughly equal (for example when league rugby union first started in 1987–88 the northern league had only 11 teams playing 10 games each, compared to 14 teams in 1996–97 playing 26 games (home & away), going up to 16 teams in 2009–10 playing 30 games each). Attendance records are from 2000 onwards unless otherwise specified.  All records are up to date up till the end of the 2019–20 season.

League records
Most titles: 3
Hull Ionians (2012–13, 2014–15, 2018–19)
Macclesfield (2009–10, 2013–14, 2015–16)
Most times promoted from division: 3
Hull Ionians (2012–13, 2014–15, 2018–19)
Nuneaton (2002–03, 2005–06, 2008–09)
Macclesfield (2009–10, 2013–14, 2015–16)
Most times relegated from division: 3
Morley (2001–02, 2007–08, 2010–11)
Sheffield (1993–94, 1999–00, 2017–18)
Scunthorpe (2002–03, 2016–17, 2019–20)
Most league points in a season: 134
Hull Ionians (2014–15)
Fewest league points in a season: 0
Manchester (2010–11)
Most points scored in a season: 1,259
Fylde (2010–11)
Fewest points scored in a season: 205
Manchester (2010–11)
Most points conceded in a season: 1,985
Manchester (2010–11)
Fewest points conceded in a season: 305
Kendal (1999–00)
Best points difference (for/against): 736
Fylde (2010–11)
Worst points difference (for/against): -1,780
Manchester (2010–11)
Most games won in a season: 28
Hull Ionians (2012–13)
Most games lost in a season: 30
Manchester (2010–11)
Dudley Kingswinford (2013-14)
Most games drawn in a season: 4
Huddersfield (2019–20)
Most bonus points in a season: 30
Sedgley Park (2017–18)

Match records
Largest home win: 124 – 0
Blaydon at home to Orrell on 24 March 2007 (2006–07)
Largest away win: 106 – 0
Fylde away to Orrell on 31 March 2007 (2006–07)
Most points scored in a match: 124
Blaydon at home to Orrell on 24 March 2007 (2006–07)
Most tries scored in a match: 18
Blaydon at home to Orrell on 24 March 2007 (2006–07)
Fylde at home to Manchester on 16 April 2011 (2010–11)
Most conversions scored in a match: 17
Blaydon at home to Orrell on 24 March 2007 (2006–07)
Most penalties scored in a match: 9
Luctonians at home to Birmingham & Solihull on 15 November 2014 (2014–15)
Most drop kicks scored in a match: 3
Fylde at home to Preston Grasshoppers on 7 January 2006 (2005–06)
Nuneaton at home to Macclesfield on 11 October 2008 and away to Bradford & Bingley on 29 November 2008 (both 2008–09)
Wharfedale at home to Scunthorpe on 19 November 2016 and Wharfedale at home to Luctonians on 28 January 2017 (both 2016–17)

Player records
Most times top points scorer: 2
 Tom Rhodes for Bradford & Bingley (2004–05, 2005–06)
 Chris Johnson for Huddersfield (2010–11, 2011–12)
 Lewis Mininkin for Hull Ionians (2015–16, 2018–19)
 Gavin Roberts for Caldy (2008–09, 2019–20)
Most times top try scorer: 3
 Nick Royle for Fylde (2006–07) and Caldy (2015–16, 2016–17)
Most points in a season: 422
 Ross Winney for Macclesfield (2009–10)
Most tries in a season: 32
 Gareth Collins for Leicester Lions (2010–11)
 Ryan Parkinson for Macclesfield (2013–14)
 Nick Royle for Caldy (2016–17) 
Most points in a match: 49
 Ross Winney for Macclesfield away to Waterloo on 30 January 2010 (2009–10)
Most conversions in a match: 17 
 Anthony Mellalieu for Blaydon at home to Orrell on 24 March 2007 (2006–07)
Most tries in a match: 7
 Matt Donkin for Doncaster at home to Whitchurch on 10 November 2001 (2001–02)
 Nick Royle for Fylde away to Orrell on 31 March 2007 (2006–07)
 Dominic Moon for Preston Grasshoppers at home to Otley on 14 April 2012 (2011–12)
Most penalties in a match: 9
 Louis Silver for Luctonians at home to Birmingham & Solihull on 15 November 2015 (2014–15)
Most drop kicks in a match: 3
 Mike Scott for Fylde at home to Preston Grasshoppers on 7 January 2006 (2005–06)
 Rickie Aley for Nuneaton at home to Macclesfield on 11 October 2008 and away to Bradford & Bingley on 29 November 2008 (both 2008–09)
 Tom Barrett for Wharfedale at home to Scunthorpe on 19 November 2016 and at home to Luctonians on 28 January 2017 (both 2016–17)

Attendance records
Highest attendance (league game): 3,750
Darlington Mowden Park at home to Macclesfield on 26 April 2014 (2013–14)
Lowest attendance (league game): 37 
South Leicester at home to Sedgley Park on 30 March 2019 (2018–19)

Highest attendance (promotion play-off): 1,500
Sedgley Park at home to Launceston (2000–01)  
Lowest attendance (promotion play-off):  925 
Stourbridge at home to Worthing Raiders on 11 May 2013 (2012–13)
Highest average attendance (club): 921
Fylde (2010–11)
Lowest average attendance (club): 85
South Leicester (2018–19)

Highest average attendance (season): 348 (2019–20)
Lowest average attendance (season): 239 (2007–08)

National League 2 North top 10 point scorers, all time

(Bold denotes players still playing in National League 2 North.)

National League 2 North top 10 try scorers, all time

(Bold denotes players still playing in National League 2 North.)

Notes

See also
 English rugby union system
 History of the English rugby union system
 National League 2 South

References

External links
 NCA Rugby

 
4
Recurring sporting events established in 1987
Sports leagues established in 1987